Lydden Hill may mean:

 Lydden, a small village in the Dover District of Kent, England
 Lydden Hill Race Circuit, a racing circuit near Canterbury in Kent, England